Motian (or Mota Jahangir) is a village in Jhelum District, Punjab province, Pakistan. 

The predominant caste of Motian are Gujjar, the village itself being founded by 4 gujjar brothers 2-3 hundred years ago. Motian currently has one Jamia Masjid and one Islamic Education Centre.

Populated places in Jhelum District